Henning Borch is a former world class badminton player from Denmark who won major tournaments from the early 1960s to the early 1970s. In the 1964 Borch reached the men's singles final at the prestigious All-England Championships, narrowly losing to fellow countryman Knud Aage Nielsen. His most impressive achievement was sharing three consecutive All-England men's doubles titles with Erland Kops from 1967 to 1969. Borch took part in five consecutive Thomas Cup (men's international team) campaigns for Denmark between 1960 and 1973.

References 

Danish male badminton players
Living people
Year of birth missing (living people)